Clairton is a city in Allegheny County, Pennsylvania, United States. It is located along the Monongahela River and is part of the Pittsburgh Metropolitan Area. The population was 6,181 at the 2020 census. Under Pennsylvania legal classifications for local governments, Clairton is considered a third-class city. It is home to Clairton Works, the largest coke manufacturing facility in the United States.

The city was the setting for the movie The Deer Hunter (1978), although none of the movie was actually filmed there (other mill towns in the Monongahela River Valley and elsewhere in the tri-state area were used). Even the opening scene, which features a large sign saying "Welcome to Clairton, City of Prayer," was shot in Mingo Junction, Ohio, although its phrasing is based on smaller signs posted at the city's boundaries during the mid-1960s (as a response to the Supreme Court's 1963 ban on sponsored school prayer).

The Montour Trail, a recreational rail-trail, extends from Clairton to Coraopolis, Pennsylvania.

Geography
Clairton is located at  (40.296419, -79.887090).

Surrounding and adjacent neighborhoods
A majority of Clairton is bordered by land with Jefferson Hills with a short border with West Mifflin to the north.

Across the Monongahela River, Clairton runs adjacent with Glassport to the north and northeast (direct link via Clairton-Glassport Bridge) and follows the curve down the river with Lincoln from the northeast to the southeast.

History

Soon after, the Carnegie Steel Company (later U.S. Steel) built an integrated steel mill and coke production facility, which eventually became one of the world's largest.

On April 12, 1903, Clairton was incorporated as a borough, and on January 1, 1922, Clairton was incorporated as a City of the Third Class with a population of approximately 11,000. This incorporation was prompted by industry, which was taxed by the three boroughs - Clairton, Wilson and North Clairton - which were chartered separately prior to the incorporation of the City of Clairton.

During the next several decades, growth and advancement indicated a thriving city. As the steel mill and coke production facilities expanded, the population of Clairton grew. Clairton took on a life of its own, including a business district and educational, religious, and cultural facilities. The city peaked in the late 1950s, and has been in decline since.

In the late 1950s, Clairton High School (CHS) had a large student body, and the city had a "feeder" system of public and parochial elementary schools. The CHS student body was soon siphoned off, however, by new schools in Elizabeth Borough, Snowden Township, and Jefferson Borough. During the mid-1950s and into the 1960s, CHS was a Class AAA competitor in the formidable Western Pennsylvania Interscholastic Athletic League (WPIAL), playing against high schools in other mill towns up and down the Monongahela River Valley.

With the decline of the steel industry in the 1980s, Clairton began to experience severe problems in its employment and tax base, which spurred a major economic shock to the community. In 1988, Clairton was designated a distressed municipality by Pennsylvania's Department of Community Affairs (DCA). Pursuant to Act 47 of 1987 (the Financially Distressed Municipalities Act), DCA commissioned the development of a recovery plan for Clairton. By 1988, the Clairton School District had consolidated its entire system into a single building (a remodeled version of the high school) and closed its other schools. Clairton High now competes at the Class A level in the WPIAL.  The high school football team has had national prominence for recent success.

Government and politics

Demographics

As of the census of 2000, there were 8,491 people, 3,710 households, and 2,203 families residing in the city. The population density was 3,072.3 people per square mile (1,187.8/km). There were 4,350 housing units at an average density of 1,573.9 per square mile (608.5/km). The racial makeup of the city was 69.12% White, 28.32% African American, 0.11% Native American, 0.16% Asian, 0.28% from other races, and 2.00% from two or more races. Hispanic or Latino of any race were 0.73% of the population. 17.5% were of Italian, 9.8% German, 9.8% Irish, 6.7% Slovak and 5.0% English ancestry according to Census 2000. 96.4% spoke English, 1.3% Italian and 1.1% French as their first language.

There were 3,710 households, out of which 23.6% had children under the age of 18 living with them, 34.3% were married couples living together, 19.8% had a female householder with no husband present, and 40.6% were non-families. Of these households, 36.4% consisted of individuals, and 18.5% had someone living alone who was 65 or older. The average household had 2.25 people and the average family size was 2.92.

The population was spread out, with 22.1% under the age of 18, 7.2% from 18 to 24, 25.0% from 25 to 44, 21.6% from 45 to 64, and 24.0% who were 65 or older. The median age was 42. For every 100 females, there were 83.7 males. For every 100 females 18 and over, there were 78.3 males.

The median income for a household in the city was $25,596, and the median income for a family was $31,539. Males had a median income of $29,399 versus $21,743 for females. The per capita income for the city was $14,608. About 15.4% of families and 19.5% of the population were below the poverty line, including 32.9% of those under age 18 and 14.0% of those age 65 or over.

Notable people

Nancy Y. Bekavac, President of Scripps College
Benny Benack, trumpet player
Tyler Boyd, NFL player
Walter Cooper, scientist
Reginald B. Desiderio, Medal of Honor recipient
Lance Parrish, MLB catcher 1977-1995, chiefly for the Detroit Tigers

References

External links
 City of Clairton official website
 G.M. Hopkins Map: South Eastern Vicinity of Pittsburgh, 1900

Cities in Pennsylvania
Populated places established in 1903
Pittsburgh metropolitan area
Cities in Allegheny County, Pennsylvania
Pennsylvania populated places on the Monongahela River
1903 establishments in Pennsylvania